"On Iowa" is one of three fight songs currently used by the University of Iowa Hawkeye Marching Band along with the Iowa Fight Song and Roll Along Iowa.  The lyrics were written W.R. Law in 1919.

Music Link
MP3 and lyrics
Full lyrics

Lyrics

See also
Hawkeye Marching Band

References

Big Ten Conference fight songs
Songs about Iowa
University of Iowa
American college songs
1919 songs